Robert Farber may refer to:
 Robert Farber (artist) (1948–1995), American artist and actor
 Robert Farber (photographer) (born 1944), American photographer